Lawrence Sanders (born April 29, 1935) is an American-British academic, social worker, politician, and former Health and Social Care Spokesperson of the Green Party of England and Wales. He is the older brother of Bernie Sanders, United States Senator from Vermont, and two-time U.S. presidential candidate.

Early life, education, and family 
Larry Sanders was born in Brooklyn, New York City to Dorothy (née Glassberg) and Eli Sanders. His father was a Polish-Jewish immigrant whose family was killed in the Holocaust, while his mother was born in New York City on October 2, 1912, to Jewish immigrant parents from Radzyń Podlaski, in eastern Poland and Russia. His father was born in Słopnice, Galicia, Austro-Hungarian Empire (now part of Poland), on September 19, 1904, immigrated to America in 1921 at age 17, and supported his family by selling paint. Sanders said that when he was a child, his family never lacked food or clothing, but major purchases "like curtains or a rug" were difficult to afford. His mother died on March 25, 1960 at age 47. His father died on August 4, 1962 at age 57. Both he and his brother attended James Madison High School in Brooklyn. Sanders has said they were young postwar Jewish radicals but part of the crowd, not yet leaders.

Sanders attended Brooklyn College of the City University of New York and obtained a master's degree in social work from the University of Oxford. He also attended Harvard Law School in the 1950s, leaving after two years to care for his sick mother. He returned after 35 years and completed his J.D. degree there in 1994.

Sanders immigrated to the United Kingdom in 1968 or 1969. He became a university lecturer first at the University of West London and later at Oxford in the Department of Social Administration.

His son, Jacob Edward "Jake" Sanders (born November 26, 1968), was elected to Oxford City Council in 2000 and was a Green Party parliamentary candidate in the Oxford East constituency at the 2005 general election.

Political career 
Sanders was active in the Labour Party in Oxford in the 1980s. He left the party in 2001 because he felt that it had moved too far to the right under Tony Blair, and defected to the Green Party.

First elected in 2005, Sanders was a Green Party county councillor representing the East Oxford division in the Oxfordshire County Council until he retired from the Council in 2013. His main focuses in county politics were social and health care services. He resigned from the board of the Oxfordshire & Buckinghamshire Mental Health Partnership NHS Trust in October 2005 in a principled stand amid concerns that proposed cuts to services would leave vulnerable patients at greater risk.

He became Chairman of the Oxford Community School's Board of Governors in September 2009, following the resignation of the previous chairman, Chris Ballinger, and six other board members. In December 2009, the Department for Children, Schools and Families approved Oxfordshire County Council's application to disband the Board of Governors and replace them with an interim executive board. On hearing the decision, Sanders said he was 'dreadfully disappointed'.

In February 2016, Sanders was appointed Health Spokesperson of the Green Party of England and Wales. He served until May 2021.

Sanders was elected as a pledged delegate for Bernie Sanders to the 2016 Democratic National Convention at the Democrats Abroad Global Convention in Berlin in May 2016. He tearfully spoke at the convention on July 26 of his intention to cast his vote for his brother.  He was the 7th-placed candidate for the Greens in the South East England constituency in the 2019 European Parliament election in the United Kingdom.

Electoral history

House of Commons 
Sanders was selected to contest the Oxford East constituency at the 2017 snap general election. He finished in fourth place with 1,785 votes (3.3%).

Sanders was selected as the Green Party candidate for the Witney by-election after Prime Minister David Cameron's resignation as an MP in September 2016. He finished in fourth place with 1,363 votes (3.54%).

Sanders ran as a Green Party candidate for Oxford West and Abingdon at the 2015 UK general election and finished in fifth place, receiving 2,497 votes, 4.4% of the total.

Notes

References

Sources 
Oxfordshire County Council (July 2005). Who and How: Your guide to Oxfordshire County Council.

External links 

 Oxford Mail: Companies may run community care, 2005-10-13
 An interview in 2006 with Larry Sanders by Saint Kermit the podcast
Meet Larry Sanders, Bernie's Big Brother, The Takeaway
Bernie Sanders brother gives glimpse into their childhood the real Bernie, Rolling Stone interview

1935 births
Academics of the University of Oxford
Academics of the University of West London
American emigrants to the United Kingdom
American people of Polish-Jewish descent
American socialists
British socialists
Bernie Sanders
British people of Polish-Jewish descent
Green Party of England and Wales parliamentary candidates
Harvard Law School alumni
Living people
Politicians from Brooklyn
New York (state) Democrats
James Madison High School (Brooklyn) alumni
Brooklyn College alumni
Alumni of the University of Oxford
American people of Russian-Jewish descent
British people of Russian-Jewish descent
Members of Oxfordshire County Council